Douglas Grove is an unincorporated community in Berkeley County, West Virginia, United States. It is located along County Route 9/16 southeast of Martinsburg.

Unincorporated communities in Berkeley County, West Virginia
Unincorporated communities in West Virginia